Edward Digby may refer to:

Edward Digby (died 1746), British MP for Warwickshire
Edward Digby, 6th Baron Digby (1730–1757)
Edward Digby, 2nd Earl Digby (1773–1856), British peer
Edward Digby, 9th Baron Digby (1809–1889), British peer
Edward Digby, 10th Baron Digby (1846–1920), British peer and politician
Edward Digby, 11th Baron Digby (1894–1964), British peer, soldier and politician
Edward Digby, 12th Baron Digby (1924–2018), British peer and British Army officer
Edward Aylmer Digby (1883–1935), British naval officer and politician